Kwun Cham Wan is a small island in Port Shelter, Hong Kong. It is under the administration of Sai Kung District.

Kwun Cham Wan is located off the southwestern coast of the island Yim Tin Tsai. It has a maximum elevation of 38 m and an area of 0.06 km2.

References

Uninhabited islands of Hong Kong
Sai Kung District
Islands of Hong Kong